Tesro Aayam is a literary movement founded by Ishwor Ballav, Bairagi Kainla and Indra Bahadur Rai in 1960 which triggered a new stir in Nepalese and Indian literature. This movement is considered a significant milestone in the history of Nepalese and Indian literature which signalled the beginning of Postmodernism.

See also 

 Ralpha
 Aswikrit Sahitya Andolan

References

Indian literature
Nepalese literature
Nepalese literary movements